Jeff Tremaine (born September 4, 1966) is an American television director, television producer, film director, film producer, and screenwriter. He is best known for co-creating the reality stunt show Jackass with Spike Jonze and Johnny Knoxville.

Career 
Tremaine was born on September 4, 1966, in Durham, North Carolina. He was born to a military family that moved frequently before finally settling in Rockville, Maryland. He is the former editor of the skating culture magazine Big Brother and a former art director of the influential BMX magazine GO, as well as a former professional BMX rider. He was the executive producer on the MTV reality series Rob and Big and the executive producer of Rob Dyrdek's Fantasy Factory, Ridiculousness, Nitro Circus, and Adult Swim's Loiter Squad.

Tremaine directed and produced all the movies in the Jackass franchise. The third sequel to Jackass, titled Jackass 3D, was filmed in 3D starting in January 2010. The whole cast of the previous films returned.

In 2014, Tremaine launched his production company, Gorilla Flicks.

After announcing that Tremaine would be directing the Mötley Crüe biopic The Dirt, Tremaine made a public appearance at the band's final tour press conference confirming and also speaking on the film expressing his excitement, stating "The Dirt is a movie I've wanted to make ever since I read the book in 2002." One year later, Focus Features announced that they had picked up the film, keeping Tremaine on to continue with directing.

In 2015, Tremaine directed the WWE Network series WWE Swerved. In 2010, Tremaine directed the 30 for 30 film The Birth of Big Air and, in 2015, directed Angry Sky. In September 2016, Tremaine directed a new safety video for American Airlines.

Tremaine also directed and produced the fourth main Jackass movie titled Jackass Forever, which released  theatrically on February 4, 2022.

Personal life 
Tremaine went to high school and was friends with filmmaker Spike Jonze. Tremaine lives in Los Angeles with his wife, podcaster and author Laura Tremaine, and their two children.

Filmography

Film

Television

Video games

Music videos

References

External links
 

1966 births
People from Durham, North Carolina
American film directors
Living people
Washington University in St. Louis alumni
Jackass (TV series)